Ozra (or Ozro) Amander Hadley (June 30, 1826 – July 18, 1915) was an American politician who served as the acting governor of Arkansas from 1871 to 1873.

Early life and education
Hadley was born in Cherry Creek, New York, and was educated in the public schools. He attended Fredonia Academy, now State University of New York at Fredonia. Hadley moved to Rochester, Minnesota in 1855, where he was a farmer and became active in local politics and government, including appointment as Olmsted County Auditor. In 1865, he moved to Little Rock, Arkansas, where he opened a general store.

Political career
Hadley was elected as a Republican to serve in the Arkansas Senate from 1869 to 1871; he was elected president of the Senate in 1871. In 1871, as part of a political compromise (see: Brooks-Baxter War), Hadley was appointed acting governor after the resignation of his fellow Republican, Powell Clayton, a controversial figure associated with the Brooks-Baxter War.  During his two-year term, Hadley sided with the Radical Republicans during the Reconstruction Era, including efforts to assist former slaves to obtain schooling, own land, vote, and hold office.  

During a period of political and civil troubles that came to be called the Pope County Militia War, Major General D. P. Upham was sent by Hadley to provide aid in Pope County "as is or may be necessary to execute the civil and criminal law of the state." The orders gave Upham discretionary power in the use of force and the power to call state guards and enrolled militia into service. Some  state guards were utilized in the county during voter registration and the November general election but were dismissed to return home after the election.

After his gubernatorial term, Hadley served as registrar of the U.S. Land Office. He was appointed as Little Rock's postmaster in 1878, and served until 1882.

Later life
In his later years, Hadley moved to Watrous, Mora County, New Mexico, where he developed a ranch. He died in Watrous in 1915.

See also 
National Governors Association
Brooks–Baxter War
Arkansas Militia in Reconstruction

References

External links
National Governors Association

1826 births
1873 deaths
19th-century American politicians
Acting Governors of Arkansas
American merchants
Republican Party Arkansas state senators
Arkansas postmasters
Minnesota Republicans
New Mexico Republicans
People of the Brooks–Baxter War
People from Chautauqua County, New York
Politicians from Little Rock, Arkansas
People from Mora County, New Mexico
Ranchers from New Mexico
Republican Party governors of Arkansas
State University of New York at Fredonia alumni